The Vanwall Racing Team is an Austrian-German auto racing team based in Greding, Germany. The team currently fields the No. 4 Vanwall Vandervell 680 in the FIA World Endurance Championship. It was founded in 2000 by Romulus Kolles and his son Colin Kolles as Kolles Racing. Prior to 2023, the team was known as ByKolles Racing before being rebranded into the Vanwall Racing Team.

History

The company initially participated in German Formula 3 before moving to the F3 Euro Series from 2003 to 2005.  Colin Kolles left the team to become director of the Jordan Grand Prix Formula One team at the start of the 2005 season, a position he held until 2009.  With his son away, Romulus moved the team to the Deutsche Tourenwagen Masters series with Audi under the sponsorship title Futurecom TME.  The Kolles team shifted their interest to sports car racing by participating in the Le Mans Series and later the Intercontinental Le Mans Cup, again with customer Audi prototypes.  Kolles returned to Formula One to helm the HRT F1 team in 2010, with Kodewa's workshop in Greding serving as a base of operations for the new team before HRT's new owners chose to release Kolles from the team and move their operations to Spain in 2012.

Kodewa participated in the 2013 FIA World Endurance Championship with the backing of Lotus Cars under the title Lotus LMP2. In 2014 they lost their Lotus backing and rebranded as ByKolles Racing with a new LMP1 prototype, the CLM P1/01.

In 2017 Robert Kubica was set to return to active racing again in the ByKolles car for the WEC season. Eventually in April he withdrew from the team.

Former Caterham F1 boss Manfredi Ravetto joined the ByKolles team in 2018. 

On 2 April 2022, ByKolles successfully completed the roll-out of its Vanwall Le Mans Hypercar, as the team prepares for entry in the 2023 FIA World Endurance Championship. The team acquired the rights to use the Vanwall name and officially rebranded to become the Vanwall Racing Team. On 11 January 2023, their entry was accepted by the Automobile Club de l'Ouest (ACO) and the team will enter the 2023 FIA World Endurance Championship in the Hypercar class with the Vanwall Vandervell 680, built to LMH specifications.

The use of the Vanwall name is currently in question after ByKolles lost a EUIPO case over the trademark of the name. It is not known what will happen to the current project.

Results

German Formula Three Championship results

Formula 3 Euro Series results

Deutsche Tourenwagen Masters results

Le Mans Series results

FIA World Endurance Championship results

Le Mans 24 Hours Result

Timeline
The series in which the team competed are listed:

References

External links

 

German auto racing teams
Auto racing teams established in 2000
2000 establishments in Germany
24 Hours of Le Mans teams
Formula 3 Euro Series teams
European Le Mans Series teams
Deutsche Tourenwagen Masters teams
FIA World Endurance Championship teams
German racecar constructors
Italian Formula 3 teams
German Formula 3 teams
Audi in motorsport
Austrian auto racing teams